Payung mesikhat is the traditional ritual umbrella among the Alas people in the province of Aceh, Indonesia. It is used for various ceremonies such as circumcision, wedding, meeting guests of honors, and so on, and it is made from black waterproof fabric with some embroideries that reflect the purpose of the umbrella. For example, a wedding umbrella depicts several scenes from the life of a girl during her girlhood, including scenes of the domestic works such as rice pounding and others.  In addition, Islamic embroidered designs are on the edge of the umbrella, and around it many strips of silver are hung.  

The ritual umbrellas are kept in families and inherited from generation to generation.  Before the Dutch colonial era, only members belonging to the Alas clan of Pagan had the privilege of passing in front of Alas local lords' houses on horseback with a ritual umbrella up, while members belonging to other clans had to close their umbrellas and dismount.

The Museum Five Continents in Munich, Germany, holds an Alas ritual umbrella, which is occasionally exhibited.

References

See also 
 Alas people

Indonesian culture
Ceremonial objects
Culture of Aceh
Umbrellas